The Encyclopaedia of Persian Language and Literature ( Dāneshnāme-ye Fāarsi-ye Zabān-o Adab) is a Persian language encyclopaedia, published in Tehran.

External links
Encyclopaedia of Persian Language and Literature

Iranian studies
Persian Language and Literature, Encyclopaedia of
Iranian books